Roads for Prosperity (often incorrectly called Road to Prosperity) was a controversial white paper published by the Conservative government in the United Kingdom in 1989; detailing the 'largest road building programme for the UK since the Romans' produced in response to rapid increases in car ownership and use over the previous decade. It embraced what Margaret Thatcher had described as 'the great car economy', although implementation led to widespread road protests, and many of the schemes contained within it were abandoned by 1996.

Overview
The proposals included 500 road schemes at an estimated cost of £23BN based on predicted traffic growth of 142% by 2025. It would have involved the doubling of the trunk road capacity with around 150 bypasses being built to meet the predicted demand.

Schemes included the following:
Widen the M25 motorway to dual 4 lanes (largely achieved by 2015)
Widen the M1 motorway between the M25 and the M18 to dual 4 lanes (partially implemented much later)
Build the new Newbury Bypass (built in the face of major protests)
Build the M11 Link Road, which became the A12 running from Hackney Wick to Wanstead and the Redbridge Roundabout in London, despite significant protests.
Extend the M3 extension past Winchester across Twyford Down (built in the face of major protests during the second half of the 1990s)

Impact
In 2018, the Department for Transport published The Road to Zero: Reducing Emissions from Road Transport.

See also
Roads in the United Kingdom

References

External links

Transport policy in the United Kingdom
Roads in the United Kingdom